Allium suworowii is a species of onion native to Afghanistan and Central Asia. It is a widely distributed and highly genetically variable species. It has gained the Royal Horticultural Society's Award of Garden Merit as an ornamental.

References

suworowii
Plants described in 1881